Kwesimintsim is a constituency represented in the Parliament of Ghana. It elects one Member of Parliament (MP) by the first past the post system of election. The Kwesimintsim constituency is located in the Effia-Kwesimintsim Municipality of the Western Region of Ghana.

Members of Parliament

References 

Parliamentary constituencies in the Western Region (Ghana)